Diana was a fast aviso or sloop of the Italian Regia Marina which served during the Second World War. Originally designed as a yacht and despatch vessel for the Italian Head of Government, she was converted for military use.

Diana was laid down on 31 May 1939 at the Cantieri Navali del Quarnaro in Fiume, launched on 20 May 1940 and completed on 12 November 1940. The planned main armament consisted of two 90/50 guns, modern anti-aircraft weapons used on the latest Italian battleships, but eventually a pair of old 102/35 4-inch guns was fitted in their place.
Six 20 mm Breda 20/65 mod. 35 guns completed the anti-aircraft defence. During the war Diana was used as fast transport for valued cargo.

The ship left Messina, Italy on 28 June 1942 to bring material and personnel to Tobruk, a city recently reconquered by the Axis forces.

In what he described as his "most satisfactory patrol" in the Mediterranean, in June 1942, Sir Hugh Mackenzie, Commander of the British submarine , reported that on their way back to Alexandria, north of Tobruk, they received a signal about an enemy ship which was due in the area at 12 o'clock on the following day and that it was vitally important to sink the ship (presumed to be the Diana). The ship wasn't sighted the following day, but during the night, they received another signal about the same ship going to be in a certain position at 12 o'clock on the following day, and; that it was vitally important to sink the ship.

The following day, the ship was sighted, eight miles away, in position 33 ° 21 'N and 23 ° 20 'E and between 11:24 and 11:46 they fired four or six torpedoes and hit the ship with two or four of them. Given the flat waters and calm weather, the submarine had been using very little periscope, but after hearing the torpedoes strike, they lifted the periscope and realised there was an escort of 4-6 anti-submarine boats accompanying the ship they had hit.

On 29 June 1942, about 75 miles north of the Gulf of Bomba, Cyrenaica, the Diana found out about the launch of four torpedoes by the English submarine . Two were avoided with a quick pull, but the other two exploded aft (back) causing the sinking of the Diana in less than 15 minutes into position 33 ° 30 'N and 23 ° 30' E dragging with it three-quarters of the men on board to result in a loss of 336 lives.

Some of the escort boats, after having unsuccessfully attacked the Thrasher, lent their first aid to the survivors. Later, between 29 and 30 June, the Arno hospital ship arrived, which took care, albeit in rough seas, of the recovery of all the survivors: 119 men.

References

Notes

Bibliography

 
 

1940 ships
Ships built in Italy
Maritime incidents in June 1942
World War II naval ships of Italy
Ships sunk by British submarines
World War II shipwrecks in the Mediterranean Sea
Ships of the Regia Marina